El Diablito (The Little Devil, which was originally to be called Volumen 2) is the second studio album by Mexican rock band Caifanes, released on June 19, 1990. Original members Saúl Hernández, Alfonso André, Sabo Romo, and Diego Herrera returned, along with a new guitar player, Alejandro Marcovich, who joined in September 1989.

Track listing 
All songs written by Saúl Hernández except where noted.

 Detrás de ti (Behind You) (Saúl Hernández, Diego Herrera, Alfonso André) – 3:36
 Antes de que nos olviden (Before We're Forgotten) – 4:45
 La vida no es eterna (Life Isn't Eternal) (Bonus Track) – 3:54
 De noche todos los gatos son pardos (At Night All Cats Are Brown) – 4:13
 Sombras en tiempos perdidos (Shadows in Lost Times) – 5:52
 El negro cósmico (The Cosmic Blackness) – 3:42
 La célula que explota (The Exploding Cell) – 3:33
 Aquí no pasa nada (Nothing Happens Here) (Bonus Track) – 4:37
 Los dioses ocultos (The Occult Gods) – 4:39
 El elefante (The Elephant) – 3:00
 Amárrate a una escoba y vuela lejos (Tie Yourself to a Broom and Fly Far Away) – 3:52

Personnel 
 Diego Herrera – saxophone, keyboards
 Sabo Romo – bass
 Saúl Hernández – vocals, guitar
 Alfonso André – drums
 Alejandro Marcovich – guitar

Certifications

Caifanes albums
1990 albums
Albums produced by Cachorro López